Robert W. Patten (1832–1913) was an American eccentric from Seattle, Washington. Few people in Seattle knew much about his past and he was seen as eccentric because of his lifestyle and outrageous claims. He lived on a houseboat, walked around town with an umbrella on his head and spent most of his time outdoors. He claimed to have been a significant historical figure in his own right rating alongside Buffalo Bill and Kit Carson.

He did become a historical figure in a different way, as a recognized part of Seattle's cultural landscape, especially after cartoonist Dok Hager created a daily comic featuring his image. He was known as Old Sport or the Umbrella Man.

The man
Born in New York in 1832,
Robert W. Patten served in the Civil War from which he drew a small pension. While prospecting in Mexico, he devised his signature hat with an umbrella mounted atop and mosquito netting tucked within.

Coming to Seattle in 1890, Patten told many colorful tales of early life. He claimed that he was born in 1811, ran away from home at age nine, was adopted by Winnebago Chief Big John and romanced the chief's daughter. Later (he said) he scouted with Kit Carson and saved John Fremont from death, for which heroics (he said) Abraham Lincoln made him Chief Scout of the Army, and that he later gave up the position to Buffalo Bill. As to the veracity of his claims, it may be said that the evidence is scanty.

Living on a Lake Union houseboat, and supporting himself by fishing and doing odd jobs, The Umbrella Man was a colorful figure of early Seattle.

Patten was well enough known that when he had a stroke in 1910, he made the front page of the Seattle Daily Times. The Times also ran a story on his life in the Old Soldiers' Home in Los Angeles. Papers in San Jose and Seattle ran stories which documented his bigger–than–life claims.

Military service
Patten was a Civil War Veteran. He served with the 3rd Wisconsin Infantry and was discharged July 14, 1864. According to the veteran's home record, he contracted rheumatism in Maryland in 1862, along with a general disability. These gave him disabled status and allowed him into the Old Soldier's Home.

The cartoon

Beginning in 1909, cartoonist John Ross "Dok" Hager drew a daily cartoon of Patten for the front page of Seattle Daily Times, calling him "'Sport". With his duck sidekick named the "Kid" (who also sometimes sported an umbrella hat), the cartoon Umbrella Man dispensed wit and wisdom along with weather forecasts on the newspaper's front page. Sometimes he reflected the paper's owner's opinion, as on July 20, 1913, when he was drawn leaving town to avoid trouble with the Wobblies.

Books
The Umbrella Man was the subject of two books of collected comics and witticisms:
The Umbrella Man by Dok. Lowman and Hanford Company, Seattle, Washington, 1911.
Sport and the Kid by Hager, J.R. "Dok". Lowman and Hanford Company, Seattle, Washington, 1913.

References

Sources
 Paul Dorpat, "Now and Then: The Umbrella Man," The Seattle Times, Pacific Northwest Magazine, April 5, 1998
 John Russ "Dok" Hager, Sport and the Kid, (Lowman & Hanford Company, Seattle, WA, 1913).

External links
 Spoon made of the Umbrella Man in 1912.

1832 births
1913 deaths
1909 comics debuts
1913 comics endings
19th-century American people
American comic strips
American comics characters
Comics based on real people
People from Seattle